Cardinal Howard may refer to:

 Philip Howard (cardinal) (1629–1694)
 Edward Henry Howard (1829–1892)